Kadelbach is a surname. Notable people with the surname include:

Achim Kadelbach (born 1939), German sailor
Hans Kadelbach (1900–1979), German sailor
Kathrin Kadelbach (born 1983), German sports sailor
Philipp Kadelbach (born 1974), German film and television director